Blair is an unincorporated community in Randolph County, Illinois, United States.

The town is named for Thomas Blair, the first postmaster and first justice of the peace.  In 1860, a post office was established.

References

Unincorporated communities in Randolph County, Illinois
Unincorporated communities in Illinois